The John Paul II Pontifical Theological Institute for Marriage and Family Sciences is a Roman Catholic pontifical institute of theological studies on marriage and family with affiliated campuses around the world.

History 
In 1981, Pope John Paul II founded the Pontifical Institute for Studies on Marriage and Family in the Apostolic Constitution Magnum Matrimonii Sacramentum, as part of the effort to develop study on the themes around the marriage and family, as well as Catholic theology on the body.

In 2017, Pope Francis issued a motu proprio Summa familiae cura ("By the greatest concern for the family"), replacing the institute with the John Paul II Pontifical Theological Institute for Marriage and Family Sciences, with a new constitution and mission. It was also affiliated to the Congregation for Catholic Education, Pontifical Academy for Life, and Dicastery for the Laity, Family and Life. The institute's chancellor Archbishop Vincenzo Paglia also anticipated inviting additional faculty and experts in light of the Institute's expanded mandate, including non-Catholics.

Activities 
The institute confers degrees including Doctor, Licentiate, and Diploma of Science in Marriage and Family under its own authority.

Governance 
The Institute's governance is, as a pontifical school, largely made up of Catholic prelates. Since August 2016, the Grand Chancellor has been Archbishop Vincenzo Paglia. The Vice-Chancellor of each session is the ordinary of the diocese in which it is located.

List of Grand Chancellors
From its founding in 1982 until 2016, the vicar general of Rome held the title of grand chancellor ex officio in his capacity as grand chancellor of the Lateran.
Ugo Poletti (1982–1991)
Camillo Ruini (1991–2008)
Agostino Vallini (2008–2016)
Vincenzo Paglia (2016–present)

List of Presidents 
Carlo Caffarra (1982-1995)
Angelo Scola (1995-2002)
Salvatore Fisichella (2002-2006)
Livio Melina (2006–2016)
Pierangelo Sequeri (2016–2021)
Philippe Bordeyne (2021-)

Locations 

The institute's locations include:

Rome, Italy, at the Lateran University (central session)
Pontifical John Paul II Institute for Studies on Marriage and Family at The Catholic University of America, Washington, DC, United States
Cotonou, Benin
Salvador, Bahia, Brazil
Changanacherry, India
Mexico City, Mexico
Guadalajara, Jalisco, Mexico
Monterrey, Mexico
León, Guanajuato, Mexico
Mérida, Yucatán, Mexico
Valencia, Spain
Melbourne, Australia (a former associated campus, ceased 2018)
Bacolod, Negros Occidental, Philippines (Associated Campus)

Notes

References

External links
John Paul II Institute - Rome - official site 
JPII Institute - Washington - official site
JPII Institute - Melbourne - official site
JPII Institute - Mexico City - official site 
Magnum Matrimonii Sacramentum, 7 October 1982 
Summa familiae cura, 8 September 2017, released 19 September 2017 

Catholic universities and colleges in Italy
Educational institutions established in 1981
Universities and colleges in Rome
1981 establishments in Italy